Derek Peter Geary (born 19 June 1980 in Dublin, Republic of Ireland) is an Irish retired footballer, who played as a full-back. He is currently the Sheffield United Academy manager.

Club career

Sheffield Wednesday
Derek is one of the few players to have played for both sides in Sheffield.
He was signed by Sheffield Wednesday from Rivermount Boys of Finglas in Dublin, his only schoolboy club, on 11 November 1997, he made 104 league appearances for the Owls and won the player of the season award for the 2001–2002 season.

Stockport County
On 26 July 2004 he joined Stockport County and made 13 appearances before transferring to Sheffield United for £25,000 on 22 October 2004.

Sheffield United
Geary became the third ex-Sheffield Wednesday player to be signed by Neil Warnock that season (the others being Alan Quinn and Leigh Bromby).

Geary made his first start for the Blades in a 3–2 away victory over Crewe at the end of December. His one and only senior career goal came for the Blades in a 2–1 away victory over Millwall in December 2004 where he scored a late winner.

Making 26 appearances in the Premiership for the Blades in season 2006–07, he subsequently signed a contract extension to keep him at Bramall Lane for a further three years in July 2007.

After being out of action for 18 months with a serious knee injury, Geary made his return to the first team in a 2–2 draw with Barnsley at Oakwell on 9 November 2009, replacing Matthew Kilgallon shortly before half time.

In June 2016 it was announced that he would take over as lead Coach of Sheffield United U18s.

Career statistics

International career

On 8 May 2007, Geary was named in the Republic of Ireland squad by manager Steve Staunton for a two match trip to the US to play Ecuador and Bolivia, of which both games were drawn 1–1. However, due to hip and thigh injuries received in the last game of the season playing for Sheffield United against Wigan Athletic, he was forced to withdraw from the squad.

References and notes

External links
Derek Geary player profile at stockportcounty.com

1980 births
Living people
Republic of Ireland association footballers
Sheffield Wednesday F.C. players
Stockport County F.C. players
Sheffield United F.C. players
Premier League players
English Football League players
Association footballers from Dublin (city)
Association football defenders
Rivermount Boys F.C. players